Denny Laine (born Brian Frederick Hines, 29 October 1944) is an English musician, singer, and songwriter, known as a founder of two major rock bands: the Moody Blues, with whom he played from 1964 to 1966, and Wings, with whom he played from 1971 to 1981. Laine has worked with a variety of artists and groups over a six-decade career, and continues to record and perform as a solo artist. In 2018, Laine was inducted into the Rock and Roll Hall of Fame as a member of the Moody Blues.

Early years
Laine was born in Tyseley, Birmingham, England, where he attended Yardley Grammar School, and took up the guitar as a boy, inspired by gypsy jazz musician Django Reinhardt. He gave his first solo performance as a musician at the age of 12, and began his career as a professional musician, fronting Denny Laine and the Diplomats, which also included Bev Bevan, future drummer with the Move and Electric Light Orchestra. Laine changed his name because he felt "Brian Frederick Hines and the Diplomats... wouldn't work", instead taking the surname of his sister's idol, the singer Frankie Laine. The first name Denny came from the fact that at the time "everyone had a backyard, and a den to hang out. I think I got that nickname there."

Career

The Moody Blues
In 1964, Laine left The Diplomats, and shortly afterwards, he received a call from Ray Thomas and Mike Pinder to form a new band, The M&B 5, which eventually was changed to The Moody Blues. He sang lead vocal on the group's first big hit, "Go Now"; other early highlights included another UK hit, "I Don't Want To Go on Without You", and the two minor UK chart hits "From the Bottom of My Heart (I Love You)" and "Everyday", both written by Laine and Pinder. Laine also sang on "Can't Nobody Love You" and "Bye Bye Bird", the latter of which was a hit in France. A self-titled EP and the album The Magnificent Moodies followed, on Decca Records. Laine and Pinder wrote most of the band's B-sides during the period 1965–66, such as "You Don't (All the Time)", "And My Baby's Gone" and "This Is My House". However, Laine's tenure with The Moody Blues was relatively short-lived, and after a number of comparative chart failures, Laine quit in October 1966. He was replaced by Justin Hayward. The last record issued by The Moody Blues that featured Laine was "Life's Not Life" b/w "He Can Win", in January 1967.

A compilation album of singles and album tracks of the early Moody Blues, led by Denny Laine, was released in 2006 under the title An Introduction to The Moody Blues.

Electric String Band and early solo career
In December 1966, after leaving The Moody Blues, Laine formed the Electric String Band, which featured himself on guitar and vocals, Trevor Burton (of the Move) on guitar, Viv Prince (formerly of Pretty Things) on drums, Binky McKenzie on bass guitar, and electrified strings in a format not dissimilar to what Electric Light Orchestra would later achieve. In June 1967, the Electric String Band shared a bill with the Jimi Hendrix Experience and Procol Harum at the Saville Theatre in London. However, they did not achieve national attention, and soon broke up.

At the same time, Laine recorded two singles as a solo artist, both released on the Deram label: "Say You Don't Mind" b/w "Ask The People" (April 1967) and "Too Much in Love" b/w "Catherine's Wheel" (January 1968). Both failed to chart, although "Say You Don't Mind" became a Top 20 hit in 1972, when recorded by former Zombies front-man Colin Blunstone.

Balls and Ginger Baker's Air Force
Laine and Burton then went on to join the band Balls, from February 1969 until their break-up in 1971, with both also taking time to play in Ginger Baker's Air Force in 1970. Only one single was issued by Balls, on UK Wizard Records: "Fight for My Country" b/w "Janie, Slow Down". The top side was re-edited and reissued on UK Wizard, and in the United States on Epic, under the name of Trevor Burton; he and Laine shared lead vocals on the B-side. The single was reissued again as B.L.W. as Live in the Mountains for 'Paladin', a small label distributed by Pye Records. Twelve tracks were recorded for a Balls album, but it has never been released.

Wings

In 1971, Laine joined forces with Paul and Linda McCartney to form Wings, and he remained with the group for 10 years until they disbanded in 1981. Laine provided lead and rhythm guitars, lead and backing vocals, keyboards, bass guitar and woodwinds, in addition to writing or co-writing some of the group's material. Laine and the McCartneys were the nucleus of the band and were reduced to a trio twice: the most acclaimed Wings album, Band on the Run, and the majority of material released upon London Town, were written and recorded by Wings as a trio. Laine was also a frequent contributor to the songwriting process and as lead vocalist. He wrote and sang several songs himself ("Time to Hide", "Again and Again and Again"), co-wrote a number of compositions on Band on the Run and London Town, and sang lead vocals on McCartney's songs in full ("The Note You Never Wrote") or in part ("I Lie Around", "Picasso's Last Words", "Spirits of Ancient Egypt"). During Wings' live concerts, Laine often performed "Go Now", his hit with the Moody Blues, and original composition "Time to Hide".

During his time in Wings, Laine also released two solo albums, Ahh...Laine (1973) and Holly Days (1976), the latter of which was also recorded by Wings core trio of Laine and the McCartneys.

With Wings, Laine enjoyed the biggest commercial and critical successes of his career. The non-album single "Mull of Kintyre" co-written with McCartney, became a hit, reaching No. 1 in the UK Singles Chart in 1977 and being the highest-selling single in that country until 1984. "Deliver Your Children" (from the album London Town), similarly co-written with McCartney and sung by Laine, was released as a double A-side with "I've Had Enough" in the Netherlands, where it charted at No. 13.

In January 1980, after Wings leader McCartney was arrested for possession of marijuana, on arrival at an airport in Japan where they were booked to perform a sell-out tour, the band's future became uncertain. Laine released his third solo album, Japanese Tears, with the title track as the single; it included several songs recorded by Wings over the years. (Laine also formed the short-lived Denny Laine Band with Wings' final drummer Steve Holley.) Though Wings briefly reunited in late 1980, on 27 April 1981, Laine announced he was leaving Wings, due to McCartney's reluctance to tour in the wake of the murder of John Lennon.

Solo career

After leaving Wings, Laine signed with Scratch Records and released a new album, Anyone Can Fly in 1982. He also worked on McCartney's albums Tug of War and Pipes of Peace and he co-wrote one more song with McCartney, "Rainclouds" (issued as the B-side of the No. 1 single "Ebony and Ivory").

Laine continued to release solo albums through the 1980s, such as Hometown Girls, Wings on My Feet, Lonely Road and Master Suite. In 1996, he released two albums, Reborn; and an album of reworkings of Wings songs, entitled Wings at the Sound of Denny Laine.

From 1997 to 2002, he toured with the rock supergroup World Classic Rockers. He left the World Classic Rockers and now tours with The Denny Laine Band, and teams up with other bands on occasion.

Laine's latest solo release is the 2008 album The Blue Musician. He has also written a musical, Arctic Song.

In 2018 he performed with the 9-piece band Turkuaz doing the music of Wings.

He has been featured in three fanzines, including Ahh Laine.

In January 2023, Laine announced tour dates in the US, including New York and Nashville, and said he was working on new material for an album.

Personal life
Laine was briefly married to Jo Jo Laine, with whom he had a son, Laine, and a daughter, Heidi. He has three other children from other relationships: Lucianne Grant (with Helen, daughter of Led Zeppelin manager Peter Grant), Damian James (with model Catherine James) and Ainsley Laine-Adams. Laine moved to the United States in the mid-1990s.

Discography

Solo albums

Compilation albums

Singles

Guest appearances

With The Moody Blues 

Albums

 Singles

With Balls reissued as by Trevor Burton

With Ginger Baker's Airforce

With Wings

References

Bibliography
Wingspan : Hits and History by Paul McCartney, ASIN: B00005B839

External links
 In the Spotlight with Denny Laine
 Denny Laine and the Diplomats, a pre-Moody Blues band featuring Denny Laine
 The original Moody Blues line up, with Denny Laine on guitar and vocals
 VH1.com's Biography of Denny Laine
 Denny Laine 2 hour audio interview on RundgrenRadio.com 

1944 births
Living people
English expatriates in the United States
English multi-instrumentalists
English rock musicians
Ginger Baker's Air Force members
The Moody Blues members
Paul McCartney and Wings members
Musicians from Birmingham, West Midlands
People from Chipping Barnet
British rhythm and blues boom musicians
English rock guitarists
English male singer-songwriters
Lead guitarists
Rhythm guitarists
British harmonica players
English rhythm and blues musicians
Rhythm and blues guitarists
English rhythm and blues singers
World Classic Rockers members